Agapanthia hirsuticornis is a species of longhorn beetle in the subfamily Lamiinae found only in Iran.

References

hirsuticornis
Beetles described in 1975
Beetles of Asia
Endemic fauna of Iran